The 2011 Hong Kong Cricket Sixes was the seventeenth edition of the Hong Kong Cricket Sixes, taking place at Kowloon Cricket Club, Hong Kong. Twelve teams competed in the tournament which lasted over three days from 28 to 30 October 2011. The tournament also featured China for the second time playing an exhibition match with a Hong Kong development team. The tournament was won by Pakistan who defeated England in the final.

Squads

Rules and regulations
All standard laws of the game as laid down by the MCC applied with the following significant differences:

General
Games are played between two teams of six players, and consist of five overs of six balls, with the exception of the final which consists of five overs of eight balls.  Each member of the fielding side, with the exception of the wicket-keeper shall bowl one over.  Wides and no-balls count as two runs to the batting side, plus an extra ball.

Last man stands
If five wickets fall (not including batsmen retiring not out) before the allocated overs have been completed, the remaining batsman continues, with the last batsman out remaining as a runner.  The not out batsman shall always face strike, and shall be declared out if his partner is declared out.

Batsman retire
A batsman must retire not out on reaching 31 runs, but not before.  He may complete all runs scored on the ball on which he reaches his 31, and retire immediately after.  If one of the last pair of batsmen is out, any remaining not out batsman may resume his innings.  In the case where there is more than one, they must return in the order they retired.

Group stage

Pool A

Pool B

Pool C

Ranking of third-placed teams

Play-offs

Knockout stage

Quarter-finals

Semi-finals

Final

Notes
 ** is used to signify that a batsman was forced to retire not out as his personal score was 31 or more.

References

External source 
http://www.espncricinfo.com/ci/content/series/533563.html

Hong Kong Cricket Sixes